The Karakorum Government or Confederated Republic of Altai was a republic created as an attempt to create a independent Altai. it lasted from 1917 to 1922, when it got annexed by the Russian Soviet Federative Socialist Republic.

Background 
The areas of southern Siberia (today's Altai, Tuva, Khakassia an neighboring areas) which were conquered by the Russian Tsardom in the 18th century (except Tuva, which was part of Qing-ruled Mongolia until it became a protectorate of Russia in 1914), comprised diversed siberian-Turkic peoples, which, by the 1910s were approximately 50% of the population of the area. They rejected Russian rule and (in general but not fully) opposed Orthodox Christianity.
By the 1900s, a new religious movement rose up, Burkhanism, emerged in response to the needs of a new people—the Altai-kizhi or Altaians who sought to distinguish themselves from the neighboring and related tribes and for whom Burkhanism became a religious form of their ethnic identity.

Thousands of Altaians gathered for prayer meetings, initially in the Tereng Valley. These were violently suppressed by mobs of Russians, instigated by the Altaian Spiritual Mission, who were afraid of the potential of the competing religion to decrease the Orthodox Christian flock in Altai. The prime motivating factor for the adoption of this new faith was Altaians' fear of displacement by Russian colonists, Russification, and subjection to taxation and conscription on the same basis as Russian peasants.
This movement and the opposition to Russification created a common sense of nationality and desire for self determination, which was to be fulfilled in the chaos of the Russian Civil War.

History 
The second Congress of the high Altai was called in March 1918 and officially created the Confederated Republic of Altai. The pro-Burkhanist government was founded by Altai painter Grigoriy Gurkin and by Russian writer and publicist Vasily Anuchin. The republic was not a fully independent entity but rather an administrative entity with some autonomy, although it was relatively independent in reality due to the chaos of the Russian Civil War. 
This was intended to include not only Altai but also neighboring republics of Tuva and Khakassia, and declared as the first step to rebuilding Genghis Khan's Mongol Empire. The republic was eventually invaded by white forces in the civil war, then by the Soviet 5th Army and destroyed in April 1920, although resistance continued well into 1922.

References 

Altai Republic
Post–Russian Empire states
Provisional governments of the Russian Civil War
Subdivisions of the Russian Soviet Federative Socialist Republic
History of Siberia
Altai people